Sašo Fornezzi (born 11 December 1982) is a Slovenian former professional football goalkeeper.

Club career
Fornezzi started his career at Dravograd and then played three seasons for Celje. He was also loaned to Krško in the Slovenian Second League before moving to Austrian side Kapfenberger SV in 2004. Two years later he joined Grazer AK but left them in 2007 for Austria Wien after their demotion due to financial difficulties.

Fornezzi then left Austria Wien for the newly-formed Austrian second-division side FC Magna Wiener Neustadt.

References

External links
 
 Profile at Austria Archive 

1982 births
Living people
Sportspeople from Slovenj Gradec
Slovenian footballers
Association football goalkeepers
Slovenia under-21 international footballers
Slovenia youth international footballers
Slovenian PrvaLiga players
Slovenian Second League players
Kapfenberger SV players
Austrian Football Bundesliga players
2. Liga (Austria) players
Süper Lig players
NK Dravograd players
NK Celje players
NK Krško players
Grazer AK players
FK Austria Wien players
SC Wiener Neustadt players
Orduspor footballers
Antalyaspor footballers
Slovenian expatriate footballers
Slovenian expatriate sportspeople in Austria
Expatriate footballers in Austria
Slovenian expatriate sportspeople in Turkey
Expatriate footballers in Turkey